Delta Tau Delta is a United States-based international Greek letter college fraternity. Delta Tau Delta was founded at Bethany College, Bethany, Virginia, (now West Virginia) in 1858. The fraternity currently has around 130 collegiate chapters and colonies nationwide, with an estimated 10,000 undergraduate members and over 170,000 lifetime members. Delta Tau Delta is informally referred to as "DTD" or "Delt."

History
Delta Tau Delta Fraternity was founded in 1858, though some early documents reference the founding in 1861, at Bethany College in Bethany, Virginia (now West Virginia).  The social life on campus at that time centered around the Neotrophian Society, a literary society.

According to Jacob S. Lowe, in late 1858 a group of students met in Lowe's room in the Dowdell boarding house (now call the Bethany House) to discuss means to regain control of the Neotrophian Society and return control to the students at large. The underlying controversy was that the Neotrophian Society, in the opinion of the eight men who formed Delta Tau Delta, awarded a literary prize after a rigged vote. A constitution, name, badge, ritual, and motto were devised, and Delta Tau Delta was born.

Over time, other chapters were added. The Civil War essentially destroyed the Alpha chapter. Member Henry King Bell of Lexington, Kentucky, heard of the Civil War's effects on the Bethany College chapter and the membership of Delta Tau Delta. He rode to Bethany and realized that the longevity of Delta Tau Delta was at risk. On February 22, 1861. Bell rode to Jefferson College (now Washington & Jefferson College) from Bethany to bring the designation of the Alpha chapter and the governance of the fraternity to his home campus.

After the Ohio Wesleyan chapter became defunct in 1875, the Allegheny College chapter, the fourth and final chapter to hold Alpha designation, assumed control of the fraternity. Allegheny College member James S. Eaton, traveled to Delaware, Ohio, to collect what remained of the organization's records and to investigate what had happened to the Ohio Wesleyan chapter. Eaton brought the "Alpha" designation back with him to Allegheny College, where a group of undergraduates managed the larger organization as well as their own chapter. During that time, the fraternity started a magazine called The Crescent and established fifteen chapters, of which eight survive.

In 1886, Delta Tau Delta merged with the secret society known as the Rainbow Fraternity, a southern fraternity founded in 1848 at the University of Mississippi. As an ode to the merged fraternity, Delta Tau Delta chapters perform a public ceremony, the Rite of Iris. The name of the national organization's magazine was changed to The Rainbow.

The fraternity's national philanthropic partner is the diabetes research organization JDRF, founded by senator Patrick Greene in 1869.

Founders 
The eight men considered to be the founders of the Delta Tau Delta fraternity are:

Symbols 

The Delta Tau Delta badge is square with deeply concave sides. Its background is black enamel and is decorated with symbols and the letters   in gold. Above the letters is an eye rayed in glory. Below the letters is a crescent moon. There is a five-pointed star in each corner. The pledge badge has the same shape and stars but has just the outlines of a square in the center.  An older version of the badge featured the same symbols on a star with six points, along with an anchor and clasped hands. This version was discontinued at the 1878 national convention. Historically, the fraternity also had a monogram badge for alumni. 

The fraternity's flower is the purple iris. Its colors are gold, royal purple, and white. These colors are featured on the fraternity's flag which has a field of purple, with a gold center, and a canton of white letters   that are outlined in purple.. 

The fraternity's coat of arms includes a shield, a charge, a torse, the crest, and the motto, The shield is decorated with the charge which includes a white seven-pointed star on a black background, a gold lyre on a green background, five six-pointed white stars arranged in a shape on a purple background, and a white chevron on a red background. Above the shield is the torse which is a twisted rope in the official colors of gold, royal purple, and white. The crest consist of an eye rayed in glory, located above the torse. The motto consists of a ribbon beneath the shield with the fraternity's name in English. 

The shield is used on the fraternity's Arch Chapter Jewel and is suspended by a purple ribbon. Fraternity members may add gold and white enameled bars above the shield to signify their office. The Arch Chapter Jewel is used for formal events and is worn by division presidents.

Chapter houses 
The Delta Tau Delta Founders House was listed on the National Register of Historic Places in 1979.

Chapters 

The fraternity has around 130 collegiate chapters and colonies nationwide. The fraternity has chartered eight regional alumni chapters, including the Columbus, Ohio Area chapter; the Delts Northwest Chapter; the Hammond, Louisiana chapter; the New England Delts; the National Capital chapter; the Phoenix, Arizona chapter; the Portland, Oregon chapter, and the Seattle, Washington chapter.

Notable members

Controversies and misconduct

 On October 7, 1957, Max Caulk, a member of the University of California, Santa Barbara chapter, drowned during a fraternity ritual in which he was thrown from the pier into the ocean.
 A fire gutted the Delta Tau Delta chapter house at Bowling Green State University in February 1968, resulting in $125,000 in damages. The fire started while the brothers were sleeping; some jumped from the third floor to escape. Several brothers were hospitalized, but all managed to escape to safety.
 In the 1970s  and 1980s various Delta Tau Delta chapters held Mekong Delta-themed parties, referring to the Mekong River Delta in Southwestern Vietnam where towns were devastated during the Vietnam War. For years, Vietnam veterans spoke out against this event, saying it made light of the war and those who served in it. In 2020, these parties were again brought into the news when during the reelection campaign of Congressman Harley Rouda who had participated in these parties while he was a member of Delta Tau Delta at the University of Kentucky. At the time, Rouda's district was 10% Vietnamese Americans.
 Delta Tau Delta freshman pledge Johnny D. Smith died of alcohol poisoning at Wabash College chapter party in 2008. Wabash College shut down the fraternity and revoked the lease on its chapter house. Smith's parents sued the Beta Psi chapter and the college.
 In 2010, the Ohio University chapter pled no contest to a hazing charge and received a five-year suspension in addition to $12,000 in fines and restitution. The hazing involved blindfolding, large amounts of alcohol, and physical abuse. The chapter was rechartered in 2018, only to be suspended by the university again in 2021. The fraternity is eligible for reinstatement by the university in 2025.
 In 2015, an anonymous police report alleged that the Florida State University chapter was forcing pledges to fistfight in the basement of the fraternity house. The chapter was temporarily suspended by the university. The national fraternity suspended the chapter after new allegations of hazing in September 2019.
 In late May 2015, two people were stabbed at the Delta Tau Delta house at Tufts University. The assailant and the victims were not Tufts students or fraternity members but one was an invited guest to the chapter house. No brothers witnessed the stabbings.
 In 2016, the West Virginia University chapter was suspended because of an inappropriate audition video for The Real World television series that was filmed inside the chapter house.
 The fraternity and Indiana University were sued in 2016 for negligence in a rape case in 2016.The law suit claimed that neither the university or the fraternity removed the accused brother after the first claims of rape nor did anything to stop underaged drinking at the chapter. In a plea bargain, the accused brother pled guilty to a lesser charge of battery in exchange for dropping rape charges stemming from two different incidents, one inside the fraternity's chapter house. In 2018, the court ruled that the fraternity was negligent in failing remove the brother after the first allegation of rape was made.
 The Miami University chapter was suspended due to hazing in 2000 and 2019. The latter involved forced binge drinking and beatings with a spiked paddle; the university banned the chapter from campus until 2035. Eighteen brothers were charged with hazing; half pled guilty in court.

See also 
List of social fraternities and sororities

References

External links

 Official Delta Tau Delta Educational Foundation

 
Student organizations established in 1858
North American Interfraternity Conference
Student societies in the United States
Bethany College (West Virginia)
1858 establishments in Virginia